Dyschirius lambertoni is a species of ground beetle in the subfamily Scaritinae. It was described by Vuillet in 1910.

References

lambertoni
Beetles described in 1910